Philippe Étienne (born 23 August 1949) is a Haitian sprinter. He competed in the men's 100 metres at the 1976 Summer Olympics.

References

1949 births
Living people
Athletes (track and field) at the 1975 Pan American Games
Athletes (track and field) at the 1976 Summer Olympics
Haitian male sprinters
Olympic athletes of Haiti
Place of birth missing (living people)
Pan American Games competitors for Haiti